Jessica Nicole Breland (born February 23, 1988) is an American basketball player for the who is currently a free agent.

High school
Born in New York City, Breland grew up in Kelford, North Carolina, and attended Bertie High School in Windsor where she was a three-sport athlete participating in volleyball and track & field and basketball. In her senior year she averaged 22 points per game and 12 rebounds for the Falcons basketball team. She was an All-American selection by McDonald's, the WBCA, and Parade Magazine, 2nd team All-American selection by EA Sports, 3rd-Team Street and Smith's All-America pick, Gatorade Player of the Year in North Carolina as a senior, and a USA U18 Women's National Team Trials Invitee.

College

In 2009, when playing for the North Carolina Tar Heels, Breland was diagnosed with Hodgkin's lymphoma, a cancer of the lymph system. She underwent chemotherapy and had to sit out the 2009–10 season, but recovered. In 2011, Breland was awarded the Honda Inspiration Award which is given to a collegiate athlete "who has overcome hardship and was able to return to play at the collegiate level".

North Carolina statistics
Source

WNBA
Breland was selected in the second round of the 2011 WNBA Draft (13th overall) by the Minnesota Lynx. She was then traded to New York. She signed a free agent contract with the Chicago Sky in 2014.

On February 2, 2018, Breland signed a contract with the Atlanta Dream.

On February 19, 2020, Breland was traded to the Phoenix Mercury in a three-team deal.

References

1988 births
Living people
American expatriate basketball people in China
American women's basketball players
Atlanta Dream players
Basketball players from North Carolina
Chicago Sky players
Connecticut Sun players
Forwards (basketball)
Indiana Fever players
Jiangsu Phoenix players
McDonald's High School All-Americans
Minnesota Lynx draft picks
New York Liberty players
North Carolina Tar Heels women's basketball players
Parade High School All-Americans (girls' basketball)
People from Bertie County, North Carolina
Women's National Basketball Association All-Stars